Liesel "Liese" Prokop-Sykora (27 March 1941 – 31 December 2006) was an Austrian athlete who competed mainly in the pentathlon and, later in her life, a politician.

Biography
Born as Liese Sykora in Tulln District, Lower Austria, on 27 March 1941, she graduated from the University of Vienna with a degree in biology and sport. In 1965 she married her former coach, Gunnar Prokop. The couple had two sons and a daughter. in 1967, she became student world champion in Tokyo. She competed for Austria in the 1968 Summer Olympics held in Mexico City, Mexico in the Pentathlon where she won the silver medal. In 1969, she became European champion in Athens, breaking the world pentathlon record. In addition, she was Austrian champion in pentathlon, long jump, high jump, hurdles, relay and shot putting.

Prokop began her political career in 1969 and became a member of the Parliament of Lower Austria. She served as regional minister from 1981 to 1992 and vice president of Lower Austria during the period between 1992 and 2004.

She joined Assembly of European Regions (AER) in 1996 and held different administrative positions in the AER, including the president of the AER which she assumed from 2001 to 2004. Later she was made honorary president of the assembly.

Beginning in December 2004 she was Austrian minister of interior for the conservative ÖVP, becoming Austria's first female interior minister. She served in the cabinet led by Prime Minister Wolfgang Schüssel until her death on 31 December 2006. She died unexpectedly of aortic dissection while being rushed to a Sankt Pölten hospital on New Year's Eve, 2006. Chancellor Wolfgang Schüssel became acting interior minister upon this incident.

She was the sister of Maria Sykora, who competed at the 1972 Summer Olympics, and aunt of Winter Olympic bronze medalist Thomas Sykora.

References

1941 births
2006 deaths
University of Vienna alumni
Athletes (track and field) at the 1964 Summer Olympics
Athletes (track and field) at the 1968 Summer Olympics
Athletes (track and field) at the 1972 Summer Olympics
Austrian pentathletes
Austrian female athletes
Olympic athletes of Austria
Olympic silver medalists for Austria
European Athletics Championships medalists
Austrian sportsperson-politicians
Austrian People's Party politicians
Interior ministers of Austria
Deaths from aortic dissection
Medalists at the 1968 Summer Olympics
Olympic silver medalists in athletics (track and field)
Women government ministers of Austria
Female interior ministers
Universiade medalists in athletics (track and field)
Universiade gold medalists for Austria
20th-century Austrian women politicians
20th-century Austrian politicians
21st-century Austrian women politicians
21st-century Austrian politicians
Medalists at the 1967 Summer Universiade